Alexander Glavatsky-Yeadon (born 24 February 1994) is a British freestyle skier. He competed in the 2018 Winter Olympics.

References

1994 births
Living people
Freestyle skiers at the 2018 Winter Olympics
British male freestyle skiers
Olympic freestyle skiers of Great Britain